Clarissa (minor planet designation: 302 Clarissa) is a typical main belt asteroid. The asteroid was discovered by the French astronomer Auguste Charlois on 14 November 1890 in Nice. The origin of the name is unknown. In 1991, 302 Clarissa was being considered as a possible fly-by target for the Cassini spacecraft, but was later removed from consideration.

The orbital plane is inclined by 3.4° to the plane of the ecliptic. There are no major planetary resonances near the orbit of 302 Clarissa. It has a retrograde spin with a rotation period of 14.4797 hours. It is classified as a F-type asteroid and is probably composed of carbonaceous material.

302 Clarissa provides the eponym for a small collisional asteroid family of mostly C-type asteroids. This group consists of 179 bodies with orbits clustered around 302 Clarissa. The family has a small extend of semimajor axis values, suggesting this is a young group; its estimated age is  Myr. 70–90% of the objects in this family have a retrograde spin, suggesting the parent body may have possessed a similar rotation. This family is one of five that are candidate sources for the near Earth asteroids 101955 Bennu and 162173 Ryugu.

Spacecraft visits 
At present, Clarissa has not been visited by any spacecraft. As of 1991, mission planning for the Cassini–Huygens spacecraft included a flyby (spaceflight) of Clarissa while leaving the inner solar system in November 1998, however due to delays, the launch of Cassini-Huygens was moved from November 1995 to October 1997, thus negating the option to pass near Clarissa. Cassini-Huygens passed by asteroid 2685 Masursky on 23 January 2000 instead.

References

External links 
 
 

000302
000302
Discoveries by Auguste Charlois
Named minor planets
18901114